Acranthera is a genus of flowering plants in the family Rubiaceae. It is found from India to South Central China south to Borneo and the Philippines.

Species

 Acranthera abbreviata Valeton
 Acranthera anamallica Bedd.
 Acranthera athroophlebia Bremek.
 Acranthera atropella Stapf
 Acranthera aurantiaca Valeton ex Bremek.
 Acranthera axilliflora Valeton
 Acranthera bullata Merr.
 Acranthera capitata Valeton
 Acranthera ceylanica Arn. ex Meisn.
 Acranthera didymocarpa (Ridl.) K.M.Wong
 Acranthera endertii Bremek.
 Acranthera frutescens Valeton
 Acranthera grandiflora Bedd.
 Acranthera hallieri Valeton
 Acranthera hirtostipula Valeton
 Acranthera involucrata Valeton
 Acranthera johannis-winkleri Merr.
 Acranthera lanceolata Valeton
 Acranthera longipes Merr.
 Acranthera longipetiolata Merr. ex Bremek.
 Acranthera maculata Valeton
 Acranthera megaphylla Bremek.
 Acranthera monantha Valeton
 Acranthera nieuwenhuisii Valeton ex Bremek.
 Acranthera ophiorhizoides Valeton
 Acranthera parviflora Valeton
 Acranthera philippensis Merr.
 Acranthera ruttenii Bremek.
 Acranthera salmonea Bremek.
 Acranthera siamensis (Kerr) Bremek.
 Acranthera siliquosa Bremek.
 Acranthera simalurensis Bremek.
 Acranthera sinensis C.Y.Wu
 Acranthera strigosa Valeton
 Acranthera tomentosa R.Br. ex Hook.f.
 Acranthera variegata Merr.
 Acranthera velutinervia Bremek.
 Acranthera virescens (Ridl.) ined.
 Acranthera yatesii Merr.

References

External links
World Checklist of Rubiaceae

Rubiaceae genera
Coptosapelteae